Mount Pirongia is an extinct stratovolcano located in the Waikato region of New Zealand's North Island. It rises to 959 metres and is the highest peak in the Waikato region. Pirongia's many peaks are basaltic cones created by successive volcanic eruptions between the late Pliocene and early Pleistocene, about 2.5 million years ago. In the adjacent picture, the characteristic profile of the mountain can be seen, along with a prominent accessory cone to the right (on the northern flank).

History

Maori people have a strong connection to Mount Pirongia. To preserve the heritage of Mount Pirongia Pirongia Te Aroaro o Kahu Restoration Society Inc was formed in 2002 as a result of deep-seated community interest in its ecological restoration.

Geography

Mount Pirongia is located 22 kilometres to the west of Te Awamutu and eight kilometres from the small settlement of Pirongia, and lies in the Pirongia Forest Park. It is clearly visible from the Tasman Sea, being just 25 kilometres from the coast at Aotea Harbour.

Geology

Mount Pirongia is the largest stratovolcano in the Alexandra Volcanic Group chain which extends inland from Mount Karioi near Raglan. It is a mainly basaltic volcano, though andesite dykes form the peaks of Wharauroa, Mahaukura, Tirohanga, Pirongia Summit and The Cone. To the west it merges into the highland terrain of the Karioi horst block and in the east it arises above the Hamilton Basin, a major rift-related depression bound by the Waipa Fault Zone.  There are at least six edifice-forming members separated by features including those resulting from large volume collapse events.  The largest debris avalanche (the Oparau breccia) cascaded at least 25 km southwest from Pirongia into the Kawhia Harbour and was larger in volume (3.3 km3) than the Mt. St. Helens collapse of 1980 (2.5 km3). The collapse was followed by late-stage eruptions from the summit area around 1.6 Ma. The mountain contains unusually crystal-rich lavas (Ankaramite basalt) that also occur on Karioi and Kakepuku but are not found elsewhere in New Zealand.

Land use

Mount Pirongia is a popular place for hunters from Hamilton seeking a quick day trip hunt, holding several feral goat herds on its bush-clad slopes. Rumours abound about small numbers of red deer released by farmers after an earlier deer farming boom went bust. Pirongia Forest Park is administered by the Waikato DoC office in Hamilton.

Ecology

Among the variety of plants and wildlife, Wood Rose or Dactylanthus taylorii, a rare and endangered parasitic flowering plant, can be found on the ridges of Mount Pirongia. Variety of podocarps are found at lower altitudes: rimu, totara, tawa and tree ferns. At higher altitudes the forest changes. Hardy plants like horopito and kamahi grow on exposed ridges, and near the summit there are mountain flax, coprosmas and ferns. Commonly found birds are: pīwakawaka, kōtare, tūī, kererū and kārearea.
Botanically, Mount Pirongia is also interesting area as it marks the transition between the warmth-loving kauri forest of the north and the beech and podocarp-beech forest in the south. The park's latitude is the naturally occurring southern limit for species such as kauri and mangeao.

Recreation

There are numerous tracks to the summit. Mahaukura - Tirohanga Circuit (8–11 hours) is a longer distance but with a gradual climb. This track is well signposted with bright orange plastic markers, but considered difficult. It leads through many steep sections but gives excellent views from Wharauroa lookout, Mahaukura peak (899 m) and Tirohanga peak. In winter and after rain the track becomes muddy and slippery. There are many narrow sections with a tangle of tree roots and rocks. There is a lookout platform on Pirongia summit from where it is possible to spot Mount Taranaki summit and Mount Ruapehu summit on a clear day (see photo below). On the west side there are Kawhia and Raglan harbours.

Between the Summit and The Cone, at the junction of the Bell and Hihikiwi Tracks, a hut built in 2015 has 20 bunks. An older hut with 6 bunks is next to it. Most of the tracks near the summit have recently been laid with boardwalks (see photo below), some of them as part of Te Araroa long distance trail.

See also
 List of volcanoes in New Zealand
 List of mountains of New Zealand by height
 Pirongia Forest Park brochure

References

Mountains of Waikato
Mount Pirongia
Pliocene stratovolcanoes
Extinct volcanoes
Mount Pirongia
Pleistocene stratovolcanoes